P word is a euphemism that may refer to the following:

Paki, a derogatory term for a person from South Asia (particularly Pakistan), mainly used in the United Kingdom
Pajeet, another derogatory term for a person from South Asia, mainly used in the America
Prostitute, considered an offensive term by most sex workers' rights activists
Pussy, slang for female sex organ
Please (disambiguation)
Porn
Penis